Deepak Raj Giri is a Nepali actor, comedian, screen writer, director and producer known for his work on the Chakka Panja series. He is one of the most successful and highest grossing actors in Nepali cinema.

Deepak Raj Giri produced and acted in the iconic Nepali sitcom Tito Satya, which ran for 12 years from 2003 to 2015. He has also worked in films such as Woda Number 6 in 2015 and Shatru Gate in 2018.

In 2016, he produced Chhakka Panja, where he also played one of the lead roles. The film was followed up by the sequels Chhakka Panja 2 in 2017 and Chhakka Panja 3 in 2018. Giri received two NEFTA awards, for "best story and screenplay", for his work on Chhakka Panja 3. The Chhakka Panja franchise is the most commercially successful films in Nepali cinema. He is also the host of the television show Crime Patrol Nepal In year 2022, Giri won National Film Award for the "best actor" for his film Chha Maya Chhapakkai which was released on 2019. Giri is currently working on his upcoming movie Chhakka Panja 4 which will be released on 3 March 2023. He confirmed that the shooting is over and are working on post-production through Social Media.

Filmography

Film

Television

Awards

References

Living people
21st-century Nepalese male actors
Nepalese film directors
Nepalese film producers
Nepalese male film actors
Nepalese male television actors
Place of birth missing (living people)
Nepalese male comedians
21st-century Nepalese screenwriters
21st-century Nepalese film directors
1969 births